Ivica Karabogdan (born 30 November 1969) is a retired Croatian football forward.

References

1969 births
Living people
People from Karlovac
Association football forwards
Croatian footballers
NK Karlovac players
NK Hrvatski Dragovoljac players
NK Istra players
HNK Vukovar '91 players
HNK Cibalia players
NK Čakovec players
NK Pomorac 1921 players
NK Inter Zaprešić players
NK Slaven Belupo players
NK Široki Brijeg players
NK Zagreb players
NK Croatia Sesvete players
Croatian Football League players
First Football League (Croatia) players
Premier League of Bosnia and Herzegovina players
Croatian expatriate footballers
Expatriate footballers in Bosnia and Herzegovina
Croatian expatriate sportspeople in Bosnia and Herzegovina